The Intendant of Montevideo is head of the executive branch of the government of Montevideo. The Intendant serves a five-year term and is limited to two successive terms. According to the Constitution, the officeholder is elected in a direct election, which takes place on a date different from that of presidential elections.

List of Intendants of Montevideo

See also 
Intendant
Intendant of Maldonado

References

External links 
 

Montevideo-related lists
Mayors of places in Uruguay